Welcome to Diverse City is the second full-length studio album released by Christian singer TobyMac. The songs on this album deal with racial tolerance in society and a desire to know God better.  Several other Christian artists appear on this CD, including Bootsy Collins ("Diverse City"), Coffee from GRITS ("Hey Now"), DJ Maj (Several songs), Papa San ("Catchafire (Whoopsi-Daisy)"), Paul Wright ("Street Interlude"), Superchick ("Stories (Down to the Bottom)"), and T-Bone ("The Slam").
TobyMac also reunites dc Talk on vocals in a remix of his song "Atmosphere", the last track of the album. The album has sold over 600,000 copies in the United States.

Track listing

History 

In addition to being one of two tobyMac albums that didn't crack the top 20 on the Billboard 200 (along with Momentum), Welcome to Diverse City is his longest album by duration and second longest by track listing (beaten only by Momentum).

Personnel

 TobyMac – vocals, synthesizer
 Coffee – vocals on "Hey Now"
 Papa San – vocals on "Catachafire (Whoopsi-Daisy)"
 M.O.C. – vocals on "Catachafire (Whoopsi-Daisy)"
 T-Bone – vocals on "The Slam"
 Max Hsu – keys and synthesizer on "Stories (Down to the Bottom)"
 Dave Ghazarian – guitar and bass on "Stories (Down to the Bottom)"
 Matt Dally – vocals and guitar on "Stories (Down to the Bottom)"
 Brian Gocher – synthesizer on "Stories (Down to the Bottom)"
 Tricia Brock – vocals on "Stories (Down to the Bottom)"
 Melissa Brock – vocals on "Stories (Down to the Bottom)"
 Brandon Estelle – vocals on "Stories (Down to the Bottom)"
 Randy Crawford, TruDog – vocals on "Gotta Go"
 DC Talk – vocals on "Atmosphere (Remix)"
 Jaime Moore – synthesizer, bass
 Mike Haynes – horns
 Mark Douthit – horns
 Barry Green – horns
 Cary Barlowe – guitar
 DJ Form – DJ
 Gabe Patillo – beat box
 Christopher Stevens – synthesizer, drums, engineering, bass, additional vocals
 Solomon Olds – beats, synthesizer, electric guitar, bass, keys, Sitar, additional vocals
 Joe Baldridge – beats, synthesizer, guitar
 DJ Maj – DJ
 Joe Weber – guitar
 Mark Townsend – guitar
 Tim Donahue – drums
 Brent Milligan – bass, acoustic guitar, electric guitar
 Jeff Savage – synthesizer, additional vocals
 Andy Selby – synthesizer
 Dave Clo – guitar
 Michael Linney – synthesizer
 Robert Marvin – synthesizer
 Josiah Bell – synthesizer
 Lynn Nichols – guitar
 Brian Haley – drums
 Dave Rumsey – guitar
 Paul Meany – bass, Rhodes piano
 Darren King – drums
 Tedd T – synthesizer
 Damon Riley – synthesizer
 Michael Ripoli – acoustic guitar, electric guitar
 Kyle Whalum – bass
 Nirva Dorsaint – additional vocals
 Jason Eskridge – additional vocals
 Joanna Valencia – additional vocals
 Tyler Burkum – additional vocals
 Paul Wright – vocals on "West Coast Kid"
 Byron "Mr. Talkbox" Chambers – talkbox on "Diverse City"

Guest appearances
 Coffee from GRITS
 Truett McKeehan AKA Tru-Dog (or truDog)
 dc Talk (Michael Tait from TAIT and Kevin Max)
 M.O.C.
 Papa San
 Superchic[k]
 Bootsy Collins

Music videos

Charts

Certifications

Accolades
On 2005, the album won a Dove Award for Rap/Hip-Hop Album of the Year at the 36th GMA Dove Awards.

Uses in media
Songs from Welcome to Diverse City, particularly "The Slam", featured many mainstream appearances.
 "The Slam" is the lead track for the opening episode of Prison Break Season One.
 "The Slam" was also used in the movies Into the Blue, Crank, and Never Back Down.
 "The Slam" was also used by wrestler Matt Cappotelli as an entrance theme while in OVW, a WWE developmental territory.
 "Catchafire (Whoopsi-Daisy)" appeared in the 2005 Usher film In the Mix.
 "Gone" appeared on the Xbox and PlayStation 2 versions of The Bible Game, released in 2005.
 "Diverse City" appears on the Xbox dance game Dance Dance Revolution Ultramix 4, released in 2006.
 "Diverse City" also appears on the show Veronica Mars in the episode "The Wrath of Con". The song can be heard in the background at the college party that Veronica and Wallace go to.

Additionally, songs from Welcome to Diverse City were published on four consecutive WOW Hits albums.
 "Phenomenon" appeared on WOW Hits 2004.
 "Gone" appeared on WOW Hits 2005.
 "Atmosphere (Remix)", featuring dc Talk, appeared on WOW Hits 2006.
 A "Shortwave Radio Mix" of "Burn for You" (from Renovating Diverse City) appeared on WOW Hits 2007.

References

TobyMac albums
2004 albums
ForeFront Records albums